The AC Sirocco nG is a Dutch ultralight aircraft based upon the 1983 Aviasud Sirocco and produced by AC Light Aircraft of Voorschoten. The aircraft is supplied as a kit for amateur construction or as a complete ready-to-fly-aircraft.

Design and development
The Sirocco nG features a  V-strut-braced high-wing, a single-seat open cockpit, fixed tricycle landing gear and a single engine in pusher configuration.

The aircraft is made from composites. The fuselage is all composite. The standard engine used is the  B&S V-2 four-stroke powerplant. Electric power has also been an option since 2012/13.

The design rights to the Sirocco series are currently held by Evert Cornet of AC Light Aircraft.

Operational history
The original Sirocco was the first ultralight aircraft flown around the world, completing the flight in the 1980s.

Reviewer Marino Boric wrote about the nG design in a 2015 review, saying, "the cockpit offers good crash safety. Very low stall speed, short take-off and landing and efficient controls all contribute to the Sirocco's appeal."

Specifications (Sirocco nG)

References

External links

Sirocco nG
2000s Dutch ultralight aircraft
Homebuilt aircraft
Electric aircraft
Single-engined pusher aircraft
Voorschoten